The Sting of the Lash is a 1921 American silent drama film directed by Henry King and starring Pauline Frederick, Clyde Fillmore, and Lawson Butt.

Cast
 Pauline Frederick as Dorothy Keith 
 Clyde Fillmore as Joel Grant 
 Lawson Butt as Rhodes 
 Lionel Belmore as Ben Ames 
 Jack Richardson as Seeley 
 Edwin Stevens as Daniel Keith 
 Betty Hall as Crissy (6 years) 
 Evelyn McCoy as Crissy (10 years) 
 Percy Challenger as Rorke

References

Bibliography
 Donald W. McCaffrey & Christopher P. Jacobs. Guide to the Silent Years of American Cinema. Greenwood Publishing, 1999.

External links

1921 films
1921 drama films
Silent American drama films
Films directed by Henry King
American silent feature films
1920s English-language films
American black-and-white films
Film Booking Offices of America films
1920s American films